The 1993 Copa CONMEBOL was the second edition of CONMEBOL's annual club tournament. Teams that failed to qualify for the Copa Libertadores played in this tournament. Sixteen teams from eight South American football confederations qualified for this tournament. Colombia and Bolivia sent no representatives. Botafogo defeated Peñarol in the finals.

Qualified teams

Bracket

First round

|}

Quarterfinals

|}

Semifinals

|}

Finals

|}

External links
CONMEBOL 1993 at RSSSF
CONMEBOL 1993 at CONMEBOL Official Website

Copa CONMEBOL
3